Isochaetes beutenmuelleri, the spun glass slug moth, is a moth of the family Limacodidae. It is found in the United States from New York to Florida and west to Colorado and Texas. The name comes from the appearance of their pupal stage, when they are very nearly transparent, and covered in spiny hairs containing poison that can cause dermatitis, as is not uncommon for other so-called stinging caterpillars.

Their wingspan is 19–24 mm. The forewings are yellowish with vague orange-brown lines and shading. The sharpest marking is a circular brown spot at the midpoint between the postmedial line. Females are larger than males and they have a thicker and more blackish spot. Adults are on wing from June to August.

The larvae feed on oak and beech.

References

Moths described in 1889
Limacodidae
Moths of North America